a.k.a. Tora-san's Lovesickness is a 1974 Japanese comedy film directed by Yoji Yamada. It stars Kiyoshi Atsumi as Torajirō Kuruma (Tora-san), and Sayuri Yoshinaga as his love interest or "Madonna". Tora-san's Lovesick is the thirteenth entry in the popular, long-running Otoko wa Tsurai yo series.

Synopsis
Tora-san returns home informing his family of his intention to marry. The plans are foiled when the woman's long-missing husband reappears. Later, Tora-san meets Utako from Tora-san's Dear Old Home (1972). Her husband has died, and, out of obligation, she is living with his demanding parents. Tora-san persuades her to come to Tokyo, where she meets her estranged father, an author. Torasan's romantic intentions with Utako come to nothing when she decides to devote her life to teaching mentally handicapped children.

Cast
 Kiyoshi Atsumi as Torajirō
 Chieko Baisho as Sakura
 Sayuri Yoshinaga as Utako
 Tatsuo Matsumura as Kuruma Tatsuzō
 Chieko Misaki as Tsune Kuruma (Torajiro's aunt)
 Gin Maeda as Hiroshi Suwa
 Hayato Nakamura as Mitsuo Suwa
 Hisao Dazai as Boss (Umetarō Katsura)
 Gajirō Satō as Genkō
 Chishū Ryū as Gozen-sama
 Seiji Miyaguchi as Shūkichi Takami
 Toshie Takada as Kinuyo
 Motoko Takahashi as Midori

Critical appraisal
Stuart Galbraith IV writes that Tora-san's Lovesick is "another fine entry in this exceptional series", which he calls "one of Japanese cinema's undiscovered treasures". He judges that the troubled relationship between Utako and her father is one of the highlights of the film. According to Galbraith, Seiji Miyaguchi—who played Kyūzō, the sword-fighting expert in Seven Samurai—gives a subtle performance, portraying the father as "intimidating yet clearly well-meaning". The German-language site molodezhnaja gives Tora-san's Lovesick three and a half out of five stars.

Availability
Tora-san's Lovesick was released theatrically on August 3, 1974. In Japan, the film was released on videotape in 1995, and in DVD format in 2005 and 2008.

References

Bibliography

English

German

Japanese

External links
 Tora-san's Lovesick at www.tora-san.jp (official site)

1974 films
1974 comedy films
Films directed by Yoji Yamada
1970s Japanese-language films
Otoko wa Tsurai yo films
Shochiku films
Films set in Shimane Prefecture
Films with screenplays by Yôji Yamada
Japanese sequel films
1970s Japanese films